CIDD-FM ("97.7 The Moose") is a community radio station that operates at 97.7 FM in Carlyle Lake Resort, Saskatchewan, Canada.

Owned by the White Bear Children's Charity Inc., the station was licensed in 2001.

References

External links

Idd
Idd
Radio stations established in 2002
2002 establishments in Saskatchewan
First Nations radio stations in Saskatchewan